is a town located in Fukushima Prefecture, Japan. ,  the town had an estimated population of 11,679 in 4599 households, and a population density of 270 persons per km².

Geography
Kōri is located in the northern Fukushima Basin on the northern border of Fukushima prefecture with Miyagi Prefecture.  The northwestern half of the town is mountainous and hilly, and the eastern and southern portions of the town are in the Fukushima Basin along the Abukuma River, which runs through the southeast of the town. There is Mount Handa (865 meters) is to the northwest of the town.
Rivers: Abukuma River

Neighboring municipalities
 Fukushima Prefecture
 Date
 Fukushima
 Kunimi
Miyagi Prefecture
 Shiroishi

Demographics
Per Japanese census data, the population of Koori peaked around the year 1950 and has been in decline since. It is now less than it was a century ago.

Climate
Koori has a humid climate (Köppen climate classification Cfa).

History
The area of present-day Koori was part of ancient Mutsu Province. During the Edo period, it was tenryō territory under direct control of the Tokugawa shogunate and was the site of a daikansho as well as a post station on the Ōshū Kaidō and the Hasshu Kaidō highways.  After the Meiji Restoration, it was organized as part of Nakadōri region of Iwaki Province. The town of Koori was created on April 1, 1889 with the creation of the modern municipalities system. It annexed the neighboring villages of Mutsuai, Danzaki and Handa on March 31, 1954.

Economy
The economy of Kōri is primarily agricultural, and is famous for production of fruit, notably peaches. It is a satellite city of the prefectural capital, Fukushima.

Education
Kōri has four public elementary schools and one public junior high school operated by the town government. The town has one private high school, but no public high schools.

Transportation

Railway
JR East –  Tōhoku Main Line

Highway
  – Koori Junction
  – Koori Junction

Local attractions
Kōri-Nishiyama Castle ruins, a National Historic Site
former Date District Office, a National Important Cultural Property

International relations
Mazie Hirono (D-HI), an U.S. Senator from Hawaii since 2013, was born in Koori.
Animator and director Akiyuki Shinbo was also born in Koori.

Koori is twinned with following town(s):
 - Elizabethtown, Kentucky, USA since May 15, 1992

References

External links

 

 
Towns in Fukushima Prefecture